The Organization and Administration of the Union Army, 1861-1865 is a two-volume book by American historian Fred Albert Shannon. The book is about Union Army history, including recruitment and enlistment during the American Civil War. It was published in 1928, and Shannon won the Pulitzer Prize for History for the book in 1929.

References

1928 non-fiction books
Pulitzer Prize for History-winning works
American Civil War books
Non-fiction books about the United States Army